Emmanuel Fianu (born 14 June 1957) is a Ghanaian Roman Catholic bishop. He was appointed Bishop of Roman Catholic Diocese of Ho in 2015 by Pope Francis upon the resignation of Francis Lodonu.

Early life

Career

Personal life

Achievements and honours

References

1957 births
21st-century Roman Catholic bishops in Ghana
Living people
Roman Catholic bishops of Ho